St. Vincent's Seminary may refer to:
 St. Vincent's Seminary (Missouri), operated during the 19th century by the Congregation of the Mission
 St. Vincent's Seminary (Germantown), formerly operated by the Congregation of the Mission in Philadelphia, Pennsylvania

See also
 Saint Vincent Seminary, operated by St. Vincent Archabbey in Latrobe, Pennsylvania